Edwin J. "Ted" Bounsall (born November 6, 1935) is a former politician in Ontario, Canada. He was a NDP member of the Legislative Assembly of Ontario from 1971 to 1981. He represented the ridings of Windsor West from 1971 to 1975 and Windsor—Sandwich from 1975 to 1981. He served under the leadership of Stephen Lewis and Michael Cassidy.

Background
Bounsall was born in 1935 in Bowmanville, Ontario. He was a chemistry professor at the University of Windsor. He graduated from Imperial College in 1964.

Politics
Bounsall was an Ontario New Democratic Party member of the Legislative Assembly of Ontario representing the provincial ridings of Windsor West (1971–1975) and Windsor—Sandwich (1975–1981). During his ten years in the Legislature, he served on numerous legislative committees. He was also one of the earlier advocates for pay equity for women in Ontario. He lost by 134 votes in the 1981 provincial election to Ontario Liberal Party candidate Bill Wrye.

In 1982, Bounsall was elected as an alderman for Windsor City Council. He served six years until 1988 representing Ward 2. He remains politically active as part of the Windsor West New Democratic Party Riding Association and is a supporter of NDP Member of Parliament Brian Masse and Windsor Ward 2 City Councillor Ron Jones.

In 1985, Bounsall was charged with shoplifting a bottle of vitamins from a drug store. Bounsall claimed that he absentmindedly put the bottle in his pocket and forgot to pay for it when he walked out. The judge did not believe his explanation and found him guilty on the charge. Bounsall was given an absolute discharge but the incident forced him to retire from politics.

Later life
Bounsall returned to teaching after retiring from politics.

References

External links
 

1936 births
Living people
Canadian Anglicans
Ontario New Democratic Party MPPs
Windsor, Ontario city councillors